Christie Mary Clark (born December 13, 1973) is an American actress. She is best known for her role as Carrie Brady in Days of Our Lives.

Early life
Clark was born  in Los Angeles, California, on December 13, 1973, to Craig and Cathy Clark. She has a brother, Kevin and a sister, Katie.

Career 
Clark began her acting career by portraying Angela Walsh in the slasher film A Nightmare on Elm Street 2: Freddy's Revenge (1985). In 1986, she began portraying Carrie Brady on the daytime soap opera Days of Our Lives. She had guest roles in television series The Magical World of Disney, Hardcastle and McCormick, Hull High and Life Goes On.

Personal life 
Clark married Thomas Barnes. The couple have three daughters. The family moved to London in August 2018.

Filmography

Film

Television

Awards
 Young Artist Awards: 1987 (nominee), 1988 (nominee), 1989 (nominee), 1990 (nominee)
 Daytime Emmy Awards: Outstanding Younger Actress: 1997 (nominee), 1998 (nominee)

References

External links
Christie Clark's Official Website
Christie Clark profile

1973 births
20th-century American actresses
21st-century American actresses
Actresses from Los Angeles
American child actresses
American film actresses
American soap opera actresses
American television actresses
Living people